Kol Kol-e Olya may refer to:
 Kol Kol-e Olya, Eyvan
 Kol Kol-e Olya, Shirvan and Chardaval